The Sir Graham Moore Islands are located off the Kimberley coast of Western Australia.

The group was named in 1819 by Phillip Parker King after Sir Graham Moore (1764–1843), who held a seat of the board of the English Admiralty Board.

The group includes: Sir Graham Moore Island, Scorpion Island, Troughton Island.

References

Islands of the Kimberley (Western Australia)